Andorra, officially the Principality of Andorra, is a small country located in the Pyrenees mountains and bordered by Spain and France. The official language is Catalan, although Spanish, French, and Portuguese are also commonly spoken.

Postal services in Andorra are unique in that they are not operated by the country itself but by its two larger neighbouring countries, Spain and France. Correos of Spain and La Poste of France operate side by side.

Both postal administrations issue their own postage stamps for use in Andorra featuring unique designs, as those of Spain and France are not valid.

French stamps 
The 1931 issues were those of France overprinted "ANDORRE".

Its first set of stamps was produced in 1932 inscribed "Vallees d'Andorre", which depicted churches such as Our Lady's Chapel, Meritxell and St. Michael's Church, Engolasters.

Spanish stamps 

In 1928 Spanish stamps were overprinted "CORREOS ANDORRA" for use in Andorra.

The first set of definitives was issued in 1929.

References

Postal system of Andorra
Andorra
History of Andorra
Andorra

fr:Histoire philatélique et postale de l'Andorre